Kenneth Webb FRSA is a British artist and founder of the Irish School of Landscape Painting. Known chiefly for his richly coloured impressionist landscapes, he has also produced figurative and abstract work over the course of his career which spans seven decades.  He was Head of Painting at the Ulster College of Art (now Belfast School of Art) from 1953 to 1960.

Biography 
Born in London in 1927, he moved to Gloucestershire aged 14 after his home was destroyed by a parachute mine. There he attended Lydney Grammar School, the first co-educational school in the country, and the Lydney School of Art. Outside of school he had a keen interest in art and started sketching landscapes of the Forest of Dean. In 1945 he received a scholarship to the Slade School of Fine Art but was called up for national service in the Fleet Air Arm.  After his national service in 1948, he decided not to take up his scholarship and instead enrolled in the Gloucestershire College of Art studying painting, pottery and graphics and graduating with a National Diploma of Design.

He moved to Belfast in 1953, where he took up the post of Head of Painting at the Ulster College of Art. In 1954 he began his Solo Exhibition career with continual shows with Galleries both in Ireland and England. He later moved to Ballywalter, where he established the Irish School of Landscape Painting in 1957. He became known for tutoring notable Irish landscape painters including Cecil Maguire and Basil Blackshaw.

In 1962, Webb started painting on the beach, resulting in the Tidewrack series. Ballywalter would remain their home until the political instability of the 1970s, made them decide to return to Gloucestershire. He purchased a derelict cottage in Clifden and converted it into a studio. Over the years he made numerous paintings Connemara landscape, and his wild garden there. Many of Webb's favorite subjects for painting are the bogs, wildflower and rocks of Connemara.

In 2018, he opened an exhibition of his work at the Royal Dublin Society. The exhibition included 170 of his paintings from between 1955 to 2018.

Commissioned Work 

In 1959 Webb was commissioned to paint the altarpiece for Bangor Abbey, which stands 25 ft high and took two years to complete. It depicts Christ rising, wearing a crown of blackthorn, a motif that runs throughout much of his work.  Blackthorn can also been seen at the foot of the mural, surrounding three saints.  In the wake of this project he was in great demand for commercial work, being commissioned by British Steel, Shell, and The Post Office among others.

The highest price paid at auction for a work by Kenneth Webb was recorded in 2005, when his Galway - City of Tribes series, was sold at Whytes, in Dublin, for €132,000.

Gallery

References

External links
 Who Are the 25 Top-Selling Irish Artists of the Last Decade? - https://news.artnet.com/market/top-25-irish-artists-last-decade-452297
 Kenneth Webb (British, born 1927) - http://www.artnet.com/artists/kenneth-webb/
 KENNETH WEBB (IRISH ARTIST DIRECTORY) - https://www.adams.ie/irish-artist-directory/kenneth-webb-art-sold-at-auction
 Kenneth Webb at Kenny Gallery http://www.thekennygallery.ie/artists/webbkenneth/
 Kenneth Webb at Gormleys - https://www.gormleys.ie/artists/kenneth-webb/95/
 Kenneth Webb and the Tec-Tank - https://visualartists.ie/events/kenneth-webb-and-the-tec-tank-exhibition-at-rds-concert-hall-dublin/
 Crawford Art Gallery permanent collection - https://www.crawfordartgallery.ie/pages/paintings/KennethWebb2.html
 Kenneth Webb at Clifden Arts Festival Highlights 2019 - https://www.clifdenartsfestival.ie/event/kenneth-webb-colour-and-texture-an-art-demonstration/kenneth-webb/
 Kenneth Webb - 'The west always called me' - https://www.advertiser.ie/galway/article/93910/kenneth-webb-the-west-always-called-me
 Kenneth Webb Chronology - http://www.treasuresirishart.com/webb_kenneth.html
 Kenneth Webb Artwork and Bio Analysis of the British Artist - https://www.artlex.com/artists/kenneth-webb/
 Kenneth Webb at Auction - https://www.lotsearch.net/artist/kenneth-webb/archive?locale=en_GB&perPage=80&page=6&orderBy=lccs-score&order=DESC

Further reading 
 Josephine Walpole. Kenneth Webb: A Life in Colour. ACC Art Books (1 Jan. 1999). .
 Thomas Kenny. Webb: A profile. Kennys Bookshop & Art (1 Jan. 1990). .

1927 births
20th-century British male artists
20th-century British painters
Living people
British landscape painters
Alumni of the Slade School of Fine Art
Artists from London
British male painters